English singer Kim Wilde has released 14 studio albums, one live album, five compilation albums, one remix album, 66 singles (including five as a featured artist), six video albums and 60 music videos.

Albums

Studio albums

Live albums

Compilation albums

Remix albums

Singles

1980s

1990s

2000s–present

As featured artist

Guest appearances

Videography

Video albums

Music videos

Notes

References

External links
 
 
 

 
Discographies of British artists
Pop music discographies